The information regarding List of rivers in the Antofagasta Region on this page has been compiled from the data supplied by GeoNames. It includes all features named "Rio", "Canal", "Arroyo", "Estero" and those Feature Code is associated with a stream of water. This list contains 41 water streams.

Content
This list contains:
 Name of the stream, in Spanish Language
 Coordinates are latitude and longitude of the feature in ± decimal degrees, at the mouth of the stream
 Link to a map including the Geonameid (a number which uniquely identifies a Geoname feature)
 Feature Code explained in 
 Other names for the same feature, if any
 Basin countries additional to Chile, if any

List

 Rio LoaRío Loa3882821STM
  Río Chela3895293STM(Arroyo de Chela, Estero Chela, Quebrada Chela, Rio Chela, Río Chela)
  Rio BlancoRío Blanco3873147STMI(Quebrada Rio Blanco, Quebrada Río Blanco, Rio Blanco, Río Blanco)
  Rio San PedroRío San Pedro3871793STM
 Río Silala3904306 Rio Siloli(BL)
  Rio San SalvadorRío San Salvador3871709STM(Rio San Salvador, Río San Salvador)
  Rio SaladoRío Salado3872603STM(Rio Salado, Río Salado)
  Rio ToconceRío Toconce3869720STMI
  Arroyo Paco-Paco3877807STM(Arroyo Paco-Paco, Estero Pacopaco)
  Rio SecoRío Seco3873102STMI
  Río ColanaRío Colana3894320STMI(Quebrada de Colana, Rio Colana)(CL)
  Rio HojalarRío Hojalar3887987STMI(Rio Hojal, Rio Hojalar, Río Hojal, Río Hojalar)
  Rio CaspanaRío Caspana3896272STMI
  Arroyo Chilcal3895132STMI(Arroyo Chilcal, Quebrada Chilcal, Quebrada Chileal, Rio Chilcal, Río Chilcal)(CL)
  Rio Piedras GrandesRío Piedras Grandes3876062STMI
  Arroyo Yusto3867598STMI
  Rio CurteRío Curte3892829STMI
  Rio TulicuneRío Tulicune3868951STMI
  Quebrada Huiculunche3887564STMI(Arroyo Huiculunche, Quebrada Huicouluncha, Quebrada Huiculuncha, Quebrada Huiculunche, Rio Huiculuncha, Río Huiculunche)(CL)
  Rio IncaguasiRío Incaguasi3887280STMI(Rio Incaguasi, Rio Incahuasi, Rio Incaquas, Río Incaguasi, Río Incahuasi)
  Arroyo Coyo3893317STMI
  Arroyo Ojos de Agua de Putana3878123STMI(Arroyo Ojos de Agua de Putana, Arroyo Ojos de Putana)(CL)
  Arroyo Aguas Blancas3900439STMI(Arroyo Aguas Blancas, Arroyo Aquas Blancas)
  Arroyo de Jauna3886925STMI(Arroyo de Jana, Arroyo de Jauna)
 Rio MachucaRío Machuca3881084STMI
  Rio PuripicaRío Puripica3874589STMI
  Rio SaladoRío Salado3872601STMI
  Rio VilamaRío Vilama3868219STMI
  Estero de la Cueva Blanca3893113STM
  Rio Aguas CalientesRío Aguas Calientes3900420STMI
  Quebrada de HonarQuebrada de Hónar3887970STMI(Quebrada de Honar, Quebrada de Hónar, Rio de Honar, Río de Hónar)(CL)
  Rio SaladoRío Salado3872600STMI
  Rio San PedroRío San Pedro de Atacama3871789STMI(Rio Atacama, Rio San Pedro, Río San Pedro)
  Quebrada de Rio GrandeQuebrada de Río Grande3873122STMI(Quebrada de Rio Grande, Quebrada de Río Grande, Rio Grande, Río Grande)
  Rio PutanaRío Putana3874563STMI
  Quebrada del Rio SecoQuebrada del Río Seco3873099STMI
  Rio PiliRío Pili3876002STM
  Quebrada Chamaca3895593STMI(Arroyo de Chamaca, Quebrada Chamaca, Rio Chamaca, Río Chamaca)
  Rio TulanRío Tulán3868954STMI
  Quebrada Rio BlancoQuebrada Río Blanco3873146STMI
  Rio FrioRío Frío3889287STM
  Quebrada Rio SecoQuebrada Río Seco3873101STMI

See also
 List of lakes in Chile
 List of volcanoes in Chile
 List of islands of Chile
 List of fjords, channels, sounds and straits of Chile
 List of lighthouses in Chile

Notes

References

External links
 Rivers of Chile
 Base de Datos Hidrográfica de Chile
 

Antofagasta